John Heyerdahl Norby (August 30, 1910 – September 19, 1998) was an American football running back in the National Football League for the St. Louis Gunners, the Philadelphia Eagles, the New York Giants, and the Brooklyn Dodgers.  He played college football at the University of Idaho.

1910 births
1998 deaths
American football running backs
Idaho Vandals football players
St. Louis Gunners players
Philadelphia Eagles players
New York Giants players
Brooklyn Dodgers (NFL) players
People from Rupert, Idaho